Browse Happy is a website urging users to upgrade their web browsers.

History
The site was initially created by the Web Standards Project in August 2004 to convince users to switch to a web browser other than Microsoft's Internet Explorer.  It focused on security issues in Internet Explorer and suggested four alternatives:  Mozilla Firefox, Opera, Safari and Google Chrome.  The core of the site was a collection of testimonials by people who had switched from Internet Explorer to alternative web browsers.

In June 2005, the Web Standards Project decided that an anti-Internet Explorer campaign did not fit with their mission, and they handed the site over to Matt Mullenweg.

On December 18, 2007, it was discovered that the browsehappy.com site contained hidden links in the footer to freecookingrecipes.net, an online recipe site.  

The site is now maintained by WordPress.com with collaboration from HTML5 Boilerplate team members.

References

External links

Computing websites
Internet properties established in 2004